Shirabad Mahalleh (also Romanized as Shīrābād Maḩalleh) is a village in Haviq Rural District, Haviq District, Talesh County, Gilan Province, Iran. At the 2006 census, its population was 550, in 140 families.

References 

Populated places in Talesh County